Orienta is an unincorporated community located at the junction of U.S. Routes 60 and 412 in Major County, Oklahoma, United States. It lies north of Fairview, east of the Glass Mountains, and south of the Cimarron River. The post office was established March 12, 1901, and took its name from the Kansas City, Mexico and Orient Railway along which it was built,

References
Shirk, George H. Oklahoma Place Names; Norman: University of Oklahoma Press, 1987:  .

Unincorporated communities in Major County, Oklahoma
Unincorporated communities in Oklahoma